Cocachacra District is one of the six districts of the province of Islay in Peru. It is spread over an area of 1,549 km².

References